Blacksburg  may refer to:

Blacksburg, South Carolina
Blacksburg, Virginia